The Persons With Disabilities (Equal Opportunities, Protection of Rights and Full Participation) Act, 1995 is an Act to give effect to the Proclamation on the Full Participation and Equality of the People with Disabilities in the Asian and Pacific Region.

India is a signatory to the said Proclamation and it is considered necessary to implement the Proclamation aforesaid. The act was enacted by Parliament in the Forty-sixth Year of the Republic of India.

See also
 Accessible India Campaign
 Disability Discrimination Act 1995

External links
 http://niepmd.tn.nic.in/documents/PWD%20ACT.pdf

Disability in India
Disability legislation